Confed may refer to:

 Confederation of Shipbuilding and Engineering Unions, a trade union federation in the United Kingdom
 FIFA Confederations Cup, soccer tournament

See also
 Confederation (disambiguation)